Bagworth and Thornton, formerly just Bagworth is a civil parish in the Hinckley and Bosworth district of Leicestershire, England, west of Leicester. The 2001 Census recorded a population of 1,836, increasing at the 2011 census to 2,605.  The parish includes the villages of Bagworth and Thornton.

History 
On 1 April 1935 the parish of Thornton was merged with Bagworth on 13 August 2001 the parish was renamed "Bagworth & Thornton".

References

Civil parishes in Leicestershire
Hinckley and Bosworth